Hypotrix spinosa is a moth of the family Noctuidae. It is a very rarely collected species that is known only from south-eastern Arizona, south-western New Mexico, and the State of Durango in northern Mexico.

Adults are on wing from mid-July to mid-August.

External links
A revision of the genus Hypotrix Guenée in North America with descriptions of four new species and a new genus (Lepidoptera, Noctuidae, Noctuinae, Eriopygini)
Images

Hypotrix
Taxa named by William Barnes (entomologist)
Taxa named by James Halliday McDunnough
Moths described in 1912